{{DISPLAYTITLE:C21H27N3O}}
The molecular formula C21H27N3O (molar mass: 337.47 g/mol) may refer to:

 ETH-LAD
 Lysergic acid 3-pentyl amide
 N1-Methyl-lysergic acid diethylamide

Molecular formulas